Daniel Richard Mousley (born 8 July 2001) is an English cricketer. He made his first-class debut on 13 July 2019, for Warwickshire in the 2019 County Championship. In October 2019, he was named in the England under-19 cricket team's squad for a 50-over tri-series in the Caribbean. In December 2019, he was named in England's squad for the 2020 Under-19 Cricket World Cup. He was the leading run-scorer for England in the tournament, with 241 runs in six matches. He made his Twenty20 debut on 2 September 2020, for the Birmingham Bears in the 2020 T20 Blast.

In October and November 2021, Mousley played for Burgher Recreation Club in the 2021–22 Major Clubs Limited Over Tournament in Sri Lanka. On 24 November 2021, in the match against Nugegoda Sports and Welfare Club, Mousley scored his first century in List A cricket, with 105 runs.

References

External links
 

2001 births
Living people
English cricketers
Warwickshire cricketers
Cricketers from Birmingham, West Midlands
Staffordshire cricketers
Burgher Recreation Club cricketers
English cricketers of the 21st century
Birmingham Phoenix cricketers